The 2019 Australian Open was a Grand Slam tennis tournament that took place at Melbourne Park from 14 to 27 January 2019. It was the 107th edition of the Australian Open, the 51st in the Open Era, and the first Grand Slam of the year. The tournament consisted of events for professional players in singles, doubles and mixed doubles. Junior and wheelchair players competed in singles and doubles tournaments. The 2019 Australian Open was the first Australian Open to feature final set tie-breaks.

Roger Federer and Caroline Wozniacki were the defending men's and women's singles champions, but were unsuccessful in their respective title defenses; Federer lost to Stefanos Tsitsipas in the fourth round and Wozniacki lost to Maria Sharapova in the third round.

Novak Djokovic of Serbia won the men's singles title at the 2019 Australian Open, defeating Rafael Nadal of Spain in straight sets in the men's final. Naomi Osaka of Japan defeated Petra Kvitová of the Czech Republic in three sets to win the women's singles title. The tournament had a record attendance of 796,435 spectators.

This is the most recent Grand Slam where no lucky losers were selected.

Tournament

The 2019 Australian Open was the 107th edition of the Australian Open. The tournament was run by the International Tennis Federation (ITF) and was part of the 2019 ATP Tour and the 2019 WTA Tour calendars under the Grand Slam category. The tournament consisted of both men's and women's singles and doubles draws as well as the mixed doubles events. There were singles and doubles events for both boys and girls (players under 18), which are part of the Grade A category of tournaments. There were also singles, doubles and quad events for men's and women's wheelchair tennis players as part of the NEC tour under the Grand Slam category. The tournament was played on hard courts at Melbourne Park, including three main show courts: Rod Laver Arena, Melbourne Arena and Margaret Court Arena. As in previous years, the tournament's main sponsor was Kia.

Final set tie-breaks were introduced for all match formats for the first time at the 2019 Australian Open. If a match reached 6–6 in the final set, the first player to score 10 points and be leading by at least 2 points won the match. Katie Boulter and Ekaterina Makarova were the first players in a main draw to compete in the new tie-break format.

For the first time in the men's singles competition, a 10-minute break due to heat was allowed after the third set when the Australian Open Heat Stress Scale reached 4.0 or higher. Hawkeye line-calling technology was extended to be included on all courts. A shot clock was introduced for the first time into the main draw, having been limited to qualifying only in 2018. Women gained parity in the qualifying competition as the draw was increased to 128 players in line with the men's draw.

In a five-year deal starting at the 2019 tournament, Dunlop took over from Wilson as the suppliers of the tennis balls.

Domestically, this was the first Australian Open to be broadcast by the Nine Network, after they secured the rights to televise the tournament from 2019 until 2024. Initially, the broadcast deal was to have started from 2020, however, the Seven Network, which had previously televised the event between 1973 and 2018, agreed to relinquish the rights to the 2019 tournament.

Point and prize money distribution

Point distribution
Below is a series of tables for each of the competitions showing the ranking points offered for each event:

Senior points

Wheelchair points

Junior points

Prize money
The Australian Open total prize money for 2019 was increased by 14% to a tournament record A$62,500,000.

1Qualifiers prize money was also the Round of 128 prize money.
*per team

Singles players
2019 Australian Open – Men's singles

2019 Australian Open – Women's singles

Day-by-day summaries

Champions

Seniors

Men's singles

  Novak Djokovic def.  Rafael Nadal, 6–3, 6–2, 6–3

Women's singles

  Naomi Osaka def.  Petra Kvitová, 7–6(7–2), 5–7, 6–4

Men's doubles

  Pierre-Hugues Herbert /  Nicolas Mahut def.  Henri Kontinen /  John Peers, 6–4, 7–6(7–1)

Women's doubles

  Samantha Stosur /  Zhang Shuai def.  Tímea Babos /  Kristina Mladenovic, 6–3, 6–4

Mixed doubles

  Barbora Krejčíková /  Rajeev Ram def.  Astra Sharma /  John-Patrick Smith, 7–6(7–3), 6–1

Juniors

Boys' singles

  Lorenzo Musetti def.  Emilio Nava, 4–6, 6–2, 7–6(14–12)

Girls' singles

  Clara Tauson def.  Leylah Annie Fernandez, 6–4, 6–3

Boys' doubles

  Jonáš Forejtek /  Dalibor Svrčina def.  Cannon Kingsley /  Emilio Nava, 7–6(7–5), 6–4

Girls' doubles

  Natsumi Kawaguchi /  Adrienn Nagy def.  Chloe Beck /  Emma Navarro, 6–4, 6–4

Legends

Men's legends' doubles

  Mansour Bahrami /  Mark Philippoussis def.  Jonas Björkman /  Thomas Johansson, 4–3(5–3), 4–2

Women's legends' doubles

Wheelchair events

Wheelchair men's singles

  Gustavo Fernández def.  Stefan Olsson, 7–5, 6–3

Wheelchair women's singles

  Diede de Groot def.  Yui Kamiji, 6–0, 6–2

Wheelchair quad singles

  Dylan Alcott def.  David Wagner, 6–4, 7–6(7–2)

Wheelchair men's doubles

  Joachim Gérard /  Stefan Olsson def.  Stéphane Houdet /  Ben Weekes, 6–3, 6–2

Wheelchair women's doubles

  Diede de Groot /  Aniek van Koot def.  Marjolein Buis /  Sabine Ellerbrock, 5–7, 7–6(7–4), [10–8]

Wheelchair quad doubles

  Dylan Alcott /  Heath Davidson def.  Andy Lapthorne /  David Wagner, 6–3, 6–7(6–8), [12–10]

Singles seeds
The following are the seeded players. Seedings are based on ATP and WTA rankings on 7 January 2019, while ranking and points before are as of 14 January 2019. Points after are as of 28 January 2019.

Men's singles

† The player did not qualify for the tournament in 2018. Accordingly, points for his 18th best result are deducted instead.

The following players would have been seeded, but they withdrew from the event.

Women's singles

Doubles seeds

Men's doubles

1 Rankings are as of 7 January 2019.

Women's doubles

1 Rankings are as of 7 January 2019.

Mixed doubles

1 Rankings are as of 7 January 2019.

Main draw wildcard entries

Men's singles
  Alex Bolt
  James Duckworth
  Jason Kubler
  Li Zhe
  Marc Polmans
  Alexei Popyrin
  Jack Sock
  Jo-Wilfried Tsonga

Women's singles
  Destanee Aiava
  Kimberly Birrell
  Clara Burel
  Zoe Hives
  Priscilla Hon
  Whitney Osuigwe
  Peng Shuai
  Ellen Perez

Men's doubles
  Alex Bolt /  Marc Polmans
  James Duckworth /  Jordan Thompson
  Blake Ellis /  Alexei Popyrin
  Gong Maoxin /  Zhang Ze
  Lleyton Hewitt /  John-Patrick Smith
  Nick Kyrgios /  Matt Reid
  Max Purcell /  Luke Saville

Women's doubles
  Destanee Aiava /  Naiktha Bains
  Alison Bai /  Zoe Hives
  Kimberly Birrell /  Priscilla Hon
  Lizette Cabrera /  Jaimee Fourlis
  Chang Kai-chen /  Hsu Ching-wen
  Ellen Perez /  Arina Rodionova
  Astra Sharma /  Isabelle Wallace

Mixed doubles
  Monique Adamczak /  Matt Reid
  Priscilla Hon /  Alexei Popyrin
  Maddison Inglis /  Jason Kubler
  Jessica Moore /  Andrew Whittington
  Astra Sharma /  John-Patrick Smith
  Samantha Stosur /  Leander Paes
  Iga Świątek /  Łukasz Kubot
  Zhang Shuai /  John Peers

Main draw qualifier entries

Men's singles

  Tatsuma Ito
  Christopher Eubanks
  Bjorn Fratangelo
  Dan Evans
  Henri Laaksonen
  Prajnesh Gunneswaran
  Gleb Sakharov
  Stefano Travaglia
  Rudolf Molleker
  Thanasi Kokkinakis
  Lloyd Harris
  Luca Vanni
  Mitchell Krueger
  Viktor Troicki
  Kamil Majchrzak
  Miomir Kecmanović

Women's singles

  Astra Sharma
  Misaki Doi
  Viktorija Golubic
  Bianca Andreescu
  Karolína Muchová
  Iga Świątek
  Veronika Kudermetova
  Anna Kalinskaya
  Paula Badosa Gibert
  Harriet Dart
  Zhu Lin
  Varvara Lepchenko
  Jessika Ponchet
  Ysaline Bonaventure
  Natalia Vikhlyantseva
  Beatriz Haddad Maia

Protected ranking
The following players have been accepted directly into the main draw using a protected ranking:

 Men's singles
  Steve Darcis (PR 90)
  Andy Murray (PR 2)
  Janko Tipsarević (PR 88)

 Women's singles
  Timea Bacsinszky (PR 23)
  Bethanie Mattek-Sands (PR 90)
  Laura Siegemund (PR 32)

Withdrawals 
The following players were accepted directly into the main tournament, but withdrew due to injuries or other reasons

Before the tournament

 Men's singles
  Juan Martín del Potro → replaced by  Pedro Sousa
  Richard Gasquet → replaced by  Ugo Humbert
  Jozef Kovalík → replaced by  Michael Mmoh
  Vasek Pospisil → replaced by  Guillermo García López

 Women's singles
  CoCo Vandeweghe → replaced by  Sachia Vickery

Sponsors 
 Luzhou Laojiao
 Emirates
 Kia Motors
 ANZ
 AccorHotels
 Blackmores
 Infosys
 MasterCard
 Rolex
 Ganten Baisuishan
 DeRucci
 Lavazza
 Barilla Group
 CPA Australia

References

External links

 Australian Open official website

 
 

 
2019 ATP Tour
2019 in Australian tennis
2019 WTA Tour
2010s in Melbourne
January 2019 sports events in Australia